Zinc-activated ion channel (ZAC), is a human protein encoded by the  gene. ZAC forms a cation-permeable ligand-gated ion channel of the "Cys-loop" superfamily. The ZAC gene is present in humans and dogs, but no ortholog is thought to exist in the rat or mouse genomes.

ZAC mRNA is expressed in prostate, thyroid, trachea, lung, brain (adult and fetal), spinal cord, skeletal muscle, heart, placenta, pancreas, liver, kidney and stomach. The endogenous ligand for ZAC is thought to be Zn2+, although ZAC has also been found to activate spontaneously. The function of spontaneous ZAC activation is unknown.

References 

Ion channels
Zinc